is a Japanese road cyclist, who most recently rode for UCI Continental team .

Major results
2016
 1st Stage 3 Tour de Kumano

References

External links

1988 births
Living people
Japanese male cyclists
Sportspeople from Osaka